Walter Burckhardt (2 March 1905 – 29 October 1971) was a Swiss dermatologist most notable for his contributions on occupational dermatoses.

During the 1930s, Burckhardt took over from Max Tièche the management of the City Department for Skin and Venereal Diseases in Zurich; he became Privatdozent in 1938 and Titularprofessor in 1947 at the University of Zurich.

Publications
 Peter J. Lynch, Stephan Epstein (editors). Burckhardt's Atlas and manual of dermatology and venerology. Williams & Wilkins, Baltimore 1977,

Further reading
 Barbara Wicki-Bühler: Leben und Werk des Dermatologen Walter Burckhardt 1905–1971. Medical Dissertation. University of Zurich, Zürich 1995.

1905 births
1971 deaths
Academic staff of the University of Zurich
Swiss dermatologists
20th-century Swiss physicians